Brianna Keyes (born 30 September 1993) is an Australian handball player for UTS Handball Club and the Australian national team.

She represented Australia at the 2019 World Women's Handball Championship in Japan, where the Australian team placed 24th.

References

Australian female handball players
1993 births
Living people
Handball players at the 2010 Summer Youth Olympics